Georgie Dent is a writer, journalist, former lawyer, and winner of the 2021 Edna Ryan award, in the category of Workforce. She was author of the book Breaking Badly, published in 2019. In 2022, Dent was executive director of The Parenthood, an advocacy group representing parents and carers. She is an advocate of women's empowerment, workforce participation, and gender equality.

Education and career 
Dent obtained a double degree in Law and Business from the Queensland University of Technology, in 2005. Her early career involved working as a junior solicitor in commercial law, at MinterEllison, followed by work writing for BRW. She subsequently obtained work as a journalist and editor.  She spent part of her early career living in Oxford, then moved to Australia.

As at 2022 Dent was a Director at The Parenthood, an advocacy organisation which represents mothers, parents and carers and their allies around Australia. She has participated in The Sydney Writer's Festival. Dent was also invited by the Swedish Government to attend the Stockholm Forum on Gender Equality in 2018.

Dent's book, Breaking Badly, is published by Affirm Press, and was described by Annabel Crabb as "funny, shocking, beautifully written".

Media 
Dent has appeared regularly on The Drum, The Project, The Today Show and ABC Weekend Breakfast in addition to making appearances on Q+A, Weekend Sunrise, Studio 10, Lateline and Sky News. Dent was a writer of a column in the Sun Herald, as well as The Age for Fairfax media, and she has also been a commentator and panelist for The Drum and Lateline. She has also written for Marie Claire, as well as being a contributing editor for Women's Agenda.

Dent was a co-instigator of the 2020 hashtag #CredibleWomen, following the Prime Minister's office's dismissal of the view that "the Australian Federal Budget ignored issues surrounding and relating to women". The Prime Minister's office commented that "no one credible" agreed with that view. However, the #CredibleWomen hashtag had 15,000 tweets posted within a few hours. Following the 2022 election, it was argued that "women stormed the 2022 election in numbers too big to ignore" and influenced the election result, supporting Dent's comments that issues related to women are important in state and federal politics. During the election campaign, Dent met Anthony Albanese to discuss these issues.

Dent has written about jobs creation, actions required for unity and safety and respect of women, the motherhood penalty, as well as issues that will improve the lives of women in Australia.

Parental leave & economic benefits 
Dent has commented that childcare, and men taking parental leave, which enables women to increase their workforce participation, will lead to better economic benefits for both the economy and individuals. The joint NSW and Victoria childcare package, was described as "an astute investment" by Dent, who commented that:'Early childhood education and care is nation-building infrastructure that we need now".Dent has advocated for a new improved paid parental leave scheme, and high quality and free early childhood education, as well as flexible workplaces, with accessibility for paid carer's leave for people who have sick children, with both the State and Federal Australian governments.

Awards 

 2022 - The Impact 25 Awards - Pro Bono Australia.
 2021 - Edna Ryan award - workforce category.
 2015 - Our Watch Walkley awards - finalist - excellent reporting of domestic violence.
 2014 - Women's Empowerment Journalism Awards in Singapore.

References 

Living people
Year of birth missing (living people)
Women in law
Journalists by publication in Australia
Queensland University of Technology alumni